Protopaussus is a genus of ground beetles in the family Carabidae, the sole genus of the tribe Protopaussini. It is found in Indomalaya and temperate Asia.

Species
These nine species belong to the genus Protopaussus:
 Protopaussus almorensis Champion, 1923  (India and Nepal)
 Protopaussus bakeri Heller, 1914  (Philippines)
 Protopaussus feae Gestro, 1892  (Myanmar)
 Protopaussus javanus Wasmann, 1912  (Indonesia)
 Protopaussus jeanneli Luna de Carvalho, 1960  (Borneo, Indonesia, and Laos)
 Protopaussus kaszabi Luna de Carvalho, 1967  (Taiwan and temperate Asia)
 Protopaussus vignai Nagel, 2018  (Nepal)
 Protopaussus walkeri C.O. Waterhouse, 1897  (China)
 † Protopaussus pristinus Nagel, 1987

References

Paussinae